Lady Margaret de Multon (died 1361) was the second to hold the title Baroness Multon of Gilsland. The title Baron Multon of Gilsland was created once in the Peerage of England. On 26 August 1307 Thomas de Multon was summoned to parliament as Baron Multon of Gilsland. As the only daughter and heiress, Margaret inherited the title and estates of her father. She married Ranulph (Ralph) de Dacre, who was summoned to parliament as Lord Dacre in 1321. The title and estates after Margaret inherited them were conveyed to the Dacre family jure uxoris.

She was succeeded by her son William Dacre, 2nd Baron Dacre.

Margaret was the great great great granddaughter of Thomas de Multon.

References
 A General and Heraldic Dictionary of the Peerages of England, Ireland, and Scotland, Extinct, Dormant and in Abeyance, (1831). John Burke, Esq. page 379

1361 deaths
English baronesses
Margaret de Multon
Hereditary women peers
Year of birth unknown
2